Kalab (also Romanized as Kalāb) is a village in Badranlu Rural District, in the Central District of Bojnord County, North Khorasan Province, Iran. At the 2006 census, its population was 732, in 194 families.

References 

Populated places in Bojnord County